Leos may refer to:

People
 Aiden Leos, crime victim
 Leos Carax, French film director, critic, and writer
 Leos Moskos (1620–1690), painter and educator
 Leoš Firkušný, Czech musicologist
 Leoš Friedl (born 1977), Czech tennis player
 Leoš Heger (born 1948), Czech doctor, university lecturer and politician
 Leoš Hlaváček (born 1963), Czech sport shooter
 Leoš Janáček, Czech composer, musical theorist and folklorist
 Leoš Kalvoda (born 1958), Czech football manager and player
 Leoš Mareš (born 1976), Czech television and radio presenter and singer
 Leoš Petrovský (born 1993), Czech handball player
 Leoš Pípa (born 1971), Czech ice hockey player
 Leoš Svárovský (born 1961), Czech flautist and conductor
 Leoš Čermák (born 1978), Czech ice hockey player
 Leoš Šimánek (born 1946), Czech traveler
 Leoš Škoda (born 1953), Czech ski jumper

Other
 Leos (mythology), characters in Greek mythology

See also
 Leo (disambiguation)